Kancherla palem is a neighborhood of Tenali city in Andhra Pradesh, India. It is situated on a state highway between Tenali and Vijayawada, in Guntur district.

References

Villages in Guntur district